Banda is a constituency of the parliament of Ghana, located in the Banda District in the Bono Region. Ahmed Ibrahim is the member of parliament for the constituency, elected on the ticket of the National Democratic Congress (NDC) and winning a majority of 6,167 votes representing 52.03% to become the MP in the 2016 general presidential and parliamentary elections. He defeated Joe Danquah who had 5,660 votes representing 47.76% who stood on the ticket of the New Patriotic Party (NPP). .

See also
List of Ghana Parliament constituencies

References 

Parliamentary constituencies in the Bono Region